Gesuba (Ge'ez: ገሱባ) or (Wolaita: Gasuba) is a City in Wolaita, Ethiopia. The approximate distance from the town of Sodo is about 33 kilometers to Southwest. And also the distance from Addis Ababa to Gesuba is 352 km  via Butajira-Sodo to South. Gesuba town is used as an administrative capital of Offa woreda. It is located at an elevation of 1,549 meters above sea level. The town Gesuba is also known as Gesuba, Mure or Murie. Gesuba is a populated place in Southern Nations Nationalities and Peoples regional state. Gesuba town is one of the six municipal
administrations found in Wolaita Zone, South Ethiopia. It is a town with more than 30,000
populations and has two high schools.
The amenities in the town are 24 hours electric light, pure water service, kindergarten, primary and high schools, health center, everyday public market and others. Gesuba lies between about 6°43'27"N 37°33'24"E.

Climate
October and September are moderately hot autumn months in Gesuba, Wolaita Ethiopia, with average temperature varying between 13.9 °C (57 °F) and 25.9 °C (78.6 °F). In October, the average high-temperature is essentially the same as in September is a still warm 25.9 °C (78.6 °F).

Demographics
Gesuba is one of populated places in the Southern Nations, Nationalities, and Peoples' Region. The town, Gesuba has a total population of 13,927. Among these Males count 6,870 and Females count 7,057.

References

Wolayita
Populated places in the Southern Nations, Nationalities, and Peoples' Region
Cities and towns in Wolayita Zone